Inteligencia de la Policía de Seguridad Aeroportuaria (Airport Security Police Intelligence) is the intelligence agency of the Policía de Seguridad Aeroportuaria of Argentina.

See also
List of Secretaries of Intelligence
Argentine intelligence agencies
National Intelligence System
National Intelligence School
Directorate of Judicial Surveillance
National Directorate of Criminal Intelligence
National Directorate of Strategic Military Intelligence

Federal law enforcement agencies of Argentina
Argentine intelligence agencies